The men's coxless pairs competition at the 1956 Summer Olympics took place at Lake Wendouree near Ballarat, Australia. The event was held from 23 November 23 to 27 November. The competition was won by James Fifer and Duvall Hecht representing the United States.

Heats
In the heats the first two pairs advanced directly to semi-finals. The others competed in the repechage for the remaining spots in the semi-finals.

Heat 1

Heat 2

Heat 3

Repechage
The first two pairs advanced directly to semi-finals.

Heat 1

Semi-finals
The first two pairs advanced directly to the final.

Heat 1

Heat 2

Final

References

Rowing at the 1956 Summer Olympics